The canton of Les Ponts-de-Cé is an administrative division of the Maine-et-Loire department, in western France. Its borders were modified at the French canton reorganisation which came into effect in March 2015. Its seat is in Les Ponts-de-Cé.

It consists of the following communes:

Blaison-Saint-Sulpice
Brissac Loire Aubance (partly)
Les Garennes sur Loire
Mûrs-Erigné
Les Ponts-de-Cé
Saint-Jean-de-la-Croix
Saint-Melaine-sur-Aubance
Soulaines-sur-Aubance

References

Cantons of Maine-et-Loire